Silje Storstein (born March 30, 1984 in Oslo) is a Norwegian actress.

Storstein was educated at the Norwegian National Academy of Theatre from 2005 to 2008. She has appeared in performances at Det Norske Teatret, Trøndelag Teater, and the National Theater in Oslo. She debuted as Sophie in the 1999 film Sophie's World, which was at the time the most expensive Norwegian film made. Since then she has held several minor film and TV roles, including Homesick and Kielergata. She is the daughter of actor and musician Are Storstein.

Theatre roles

References

External references 
 
 Profile at Trøndelag Teater
 Sofies verden (Sophie's World) at filmweb.no

1984 births
Living people
Norwegian actresses
Oslo National Academy of the Arts alumni